The Light (French: L'Équipier) is a 2004 French film directed by Philippe Lioret and starring Sandrine Bonnaire, Émilie Dequenne, Grégori Derangère, and Philippe Torreton.

Plot
Following her mother's demise Camille returns to the isle which once was her home. She comes across the written memories of former lighthouse guard Antoine Cassendi. The unpublished book changes her life.

Cast 
 Sandrine Bonnaire as Mabé Le Guen
 Philippe Torreton as Yvon Le Guen
 Grégori Dérangère as Antoine Cassenti
 Émilie Dequenne as Brigitte
 Anne Consigny as Camille
 Martine Sarcey as Jeanne 
 Nathalie Besançon as Younger Jeanne 
 Christophe Kourotchkine as Lebras
 Jean Sénéjoux as Rémi
 Thierry Lavat as Tinou
 Éric Bonicatto as Jo
 Béatrice Laout as Nicole
 Frédéric Pellegeay as Théo
 Bernard Mazzinghi as André
 Nadia Barentin as Huberte
 Blandine Pélissier as Christiane

Accolades

References

External links 
 

2004 films
2004 drama films
Films directed by Philippe Lioret
French drama films
2000s French-language films
Films scored by Nicola Piovani
2000s French films